John Moore Walker, Jr. (November 24, 1888 - July 16, 1951) was the 3rd bishop in the Episcopal Diocese of Atlanta, and was the 1st bishop born in the state of Georgia to a bishop in the state of Georgia.

Background
Walker was born on November 24, 1888 in Macon, Georgia to John Moore Walker, Sr., and Clara Pruyn Roosevelt. In 1910 he graduated Phi Beta Kappa from the University of Georgia. In 1913 he received his Bachelor of Divinity from the University of the South in Sewanee, Tennessee. Frederick F. Reese ordained Walker as a deacon and later as a priest at Christ Church in Macon, Georgia, Walker's childhood parish.

From 1914 to 1918, Walker served several southeast Georgia towns as a Missionary Priest. Finally, in 1918, he was called to be rector of St Paul's Church in Albany, Georgia. In 1926 he became rector of St Peter's Church in Charlotte, North Carolina and in 1931 became rector of St. Luke's Episcopal Church in Atlanta, Georgia. In 1942 he was elected bishop of Atlanta and consecrated on September 29, 1942 St Luke's Church. He died on July 16, 1951.

Consecrators

 Henry S. Tucker, 19th Presiding Bishop of the Episcopal Church USA
 Frank A. Juhan
 Richard B. Mitchell
John Walker was the 434th bishop consecrated in the Episcopal Church.

See Also...
 Episcopal Diocese of Atlanta
 List of Bishop Succession in the Episcopal Church

References

 Bishop Walker's Page, Diocese of Atlanta Centennial website. Accessed: 2 March 2006
 The Episcopal Church Annual. Morehouse Publishing: New York, NY (2005).

1888 births
1951 deaths
University of Georgia alumni
Episcopal bishops of Atlanta
Sewanee: The University of the South alumni
People from Macon, Georgia
20th-century American Episcopalians